Hazarbasanov Ridge (‘Hazarbasanov Hrebet’ \ha-'z&r-ba-sa-nov 'hre-bet\) is the mostly ice-free ridge extending 5.5 km, 2.4 km wide and rising to 1022 m on the southwest side of Sjögren Glacier on southern Trinity Peninsula in Graham Land, Antarctica.

The feature is named after Dobri Hazarbasanov (b. 1960), physician at St. Kliment Ohridski base during the 1995/96 and subsequent seasons.

Location

Maps
 Antarctic Digital Database (ADD). Scale 1:250000 topographic map of Antarctica. Scientific Committee on Antarctic Research (SCAR). Since 1993, regularly upgraded and updated.

Notes

References
 Hazarbasanov Ridge. SCAR Composite Antarctic Gazetteer.
 Bulgarian Antarctic Gazetteer. Antarctic Place-names Commission. (details in Bulgarian, basic data in English)

External links
 Hazarbasanov Ridge. Copernix satellite image

Ridges of Graham Land
Landforms of Trinity Peninsula
Bulgaria and the Antarctic